Lulu Schwartz (born Stephen Suleyman Schwartz, September 9, 1948) is an American Sufi journalist, columnist, and author. She has been published in a variety of media, including The Wall Street Journal. She served as the director of the "Islam and Democracy Project" and as a senior advisor at the Foundation for Defense of Democracies, a think-tank based in Washington, DC. She is the founder and executive director of the Washington, D.C.-based Center for Islamic Pluralism. In 2011–2012 she was a member of Folks Magazine's Editorial Board.

She has been an adherent of the Hanafi school of Islam since 1997. She was a major intellectual figure in the neo-conservative movement that held considerable influence in the administration of George W. Bush. Her criticism of Islamic Fundamentalism, especially the Wahhabi sect of Sunni Islam, has attracted controversy. Alongside fellow neo-conservative writer Daniel Pipes, Schwartz has been a major critic of Islamism; which she accuse of being the new ideological nemesis of the West after the fall of Nazi Germany and Soviet Union.

Schwartz is a major critic of the AKP government in Turkey, considering it as a hostile pan-Islamist threat and calls for US government to cut ties with Turkey. She has also condemned the Islamic Republic of Iran stating that American academia is under threat of infiltration by radical Islamist state agents of Iran.

Early life
Schwartz was born in Columbus, Ohio to Horace Schwartz, a Jewish independent bookseller. Her mother, the daughter of a Protestant preacher, was a career social services worker. Schwartz later described both of her parents as "radical leftists and quite antireligious", her father a "fellow traveller", her mother a member of the Communist Party. She was baptized in the Presbyterian church as an infant.

The family moved to San Francisco when she was young, where her father Horace became a literary agent. She attended Lowell High School and she became affiliated with Leninist communism until 1984.

Labor activism and literary career
After college, Schwartz became a member of the Sailors' Union of the Pacific.  With others, she founded a small semi-Trotskyist group FOCUS. In 1985, the S.U.P. commissioned Schwartz to write Brotherhood of the Sea: A History of the Sailors' Union of the Pacific as part of its of 100th anniversary commemoration.

The San Francisco Bay Guardian wrote of Schwartz in 1989: "As he himself readily admits, Schwartz has made a lot of enemies over the years as he performed a series of dizzying ideological leaps: from the Industrial Workers of the World to meeting with Oliver North and the Outreach Group on Central America in the basement of the White House, from minuscule Trotskyist sects meeting in North Beach cafes to serving as a U.S. press representative for a Contra leader.

In the 1990s, Schwartz spent a decade as a staff writer for the San Francisco Chronicle. She was a member of the local union at the Chronicle, a branch of the Newspaper Guild. During the NATO bombing of Serbia, Schwartz published a piece in the Chronicle accusing the Serbs of countless crimes while absolving the Albanians and the KLA of all responsibility and brushing all Serb arguments as mere propaganda. The article was criticized by journalist Robert W. Merry for being tendentiously biased and highly inaccurate.

At the end of 1997, she converted to Islam. In 1999, Schwartz left the Chronicle, and moved to Sarajevo, Bosnia and Herzegovina, where she lived for the next 18 months.

While in Bosnia, she published the pro-Albanian book "Kosovo: Background to a War". It was criticized by historian Robert C. Austin for weak and polemical writing and for being "decidedly biased in favour of the Albanian community in Kosovo", who concluded that "When [s]he is attempting to be an historian, Schwartz is at his worst".

Schwartz also supported the Iraq War.

On March 25, 2005, Schwartz launched the Center for Islamic Pluralism. The center is a nonprofit organization based in Washington, D.C., with Schwartz as executive director.

In 2017, Schwartz came out as a transgender woman.

Political career 

In 2020, under the name Stephen (Lulu) Schwartz, Schwartz ran for the San Francisco Board of Supervisors in District 3. She came in fourth, with 1,374 votes (4.82 percent of the vote). The winner was Aaron Peskin.

Published works 
 
 A Sleepwalker's Guide to San Francisco: Poems from Three Lustra, 1966–1981. San Francisco: La Santa Espina, 1983.
 Brotherhood of the Sea: A History of the Sailors’ Union of the Pacific. New Brunswick, NJ: Transaction Books, 1986. .
 Spanish Marxism vs. Soviet Communism: A History of the P.O.U.M (with Victor Alba). New Brunswick, NJ: Transaction Books, 1988. .
 A Strange Silence: The Emergence of Democracy in Nicaragua. San Francisco: ICS Press, 1992. .
 From West to East: California and the Making of the American Mind. New York: The Free Press, 1998. .
 Kosovo: Background to a War.  London: Anthem Press, 2000.  
 Intellectuals and Assassins: Writings at the End of Soviet Communism. New York: Anthem Press, 2001. .
 The Two Faces of Islam: The House of Sa'ud from Tradition to Terror. New York: Doubleday, 2002. .
 An Activist's Guide to Arab and Muslim Campus and Community Organizations in North America Los Angeles: Center for the Study of Popular Culture, 2003  
 Sarajevo Rose: A Balkan Jewish Notebook. London: Saqi Books, 2005. .
 Is It Good for the Jews?: The Crisis of America's Israel Lobby. New York: Doubleday, 2006. .
 The Other Islam: Sufism and the Road to Global Harmony.  New York: Doubleday, 2008.  .

Notes and references

External links
 Center for Islamic Pluralism
 Sailors’ Union of the Pacific history 
 

Interviews
 Q&A with Schwartz from National Review Online
 Stephen Schwartz: Eternally with Albanians  from Telegrafi.com

1948 births
21st-century American historians
21st-century American writers
American Muslims
American Sufis
Neoconservatism
American journalists
American non-fiction writers
American nonprofit executives
American people of Jewish descent
American women historians
American women journalists
American women non-fiction writers
LGBT people from Ohio
Converts to Islam from Christianity
Critics of Islamism
Former Marxists
Historians from Ohio
Living people
Transgender Muslims
Transgender women
Writers from Columbus, Ohio